Matushka Olga Michael (February 3, 1916 – November 8, 1979), also known as Olinka, was a Eastern Orthodox priest's wife from Kwethluk village, on the Kuskokwim River in Alaska.

Life
Matushka Olga was a Native Alaskan of Yup'ik origin.  Her husband was the village postmaster and manager of the general store, and later archpriest, Father Nikolai Michael.  Serving her community not only as a priest's wife, but also as a midwife, Matushka Olga gave birth to and raised several children, many of whom she gave birth to without the aid of a midwife of her own.

Matushka Olga was known for her empathy and caring for those who had suffered abuse of all kinds, especially sexual abuse.  While her family was poor, she was generous to those who were poorer, often giving away her children's clothes to the needy.  She was also known for her ability to tell when a woman was pregnant, even before the woman herself had missed her period.

When Matushka Olga reposed, many people from miles around wanted to come to her funeral, but since it was November, the winter weather made it impossible.  But a wind from the south brought warm weather, thawing the ice and snow to make the trek to Kwethluk possible.  When the mourners exited the church to take her body to the graveyard, a flock of birds followed.  The ones who dug her grave found that the ground, too, had thawed.  The evening after her funeral, the normal harsh winter weather returned.

Potential glorification
Olga receives veneration in the region in which she lived her earthly life, and personal veneration from many Orthodox women touched by her life story.  It is said that she has appeared to those in need of healing, sometimes alongside the Mother of God.  She has not been formally glorified yet by any jurisdiction.

References

External links
 Saint Olga of Alaska:  Northern Light of God's Holy Church Facebook Page includes updated information.

1916 births
1979 deaths
American midwives
Christians from Alaska
Native American Christians
People from Bethel Census Area, Alaska
Russian Orthodox Christians from the United States
Yupik people
20th-century American women